Pott disease is tuberculosis of the spine, usually due to haematogenous spread from other sites, often the lungs. The lower thoracic and upper lumbar vertebrae areas of the spine are most often affected.

It causes a kind of tuberculous arthritis of the intervertebral joints. The infection can spread from two adjacent vertebrae into the adjoining intervertebral disc space. If only one vertebra is affected, the disc is normal, but if two are involved, the disc, which is avascular, cannot receive nutrients, and collapses. In a process called caseous necrosis, the disc tissue dies, leading to vertebral narrowing and eventually to vertebral collapse and spinal damage. A dry soft-tissue mass often forms and superinfection is rare.

Spread of infection from the lumbar vertebrae to the psoas muscle, causing abscesses, is not uncommon.

The disease is named after Percivall Pott, the British surgeon who first described it in the late 18th century.

Diagnosis
 Blood tests
– Complete blood count: leukocytosis
– Elevated erythrocyte sedimentation rate: >100 mm/h
 Tuberculin skin test
– Tuberculin skin test (purified protein derivative [PPD]) results are positive in 84–95% of patients with Pott disease who are not infected with HIV.

 Radiographs of the spine
– Radiographic changes associated with Pott disease present relatively late. These radiographic changes are characteristic of spinal tuberculosis on plain radiography:
 Lytic destruction of anterior portion of vertebral body
 Increased anterior wedging
 Collapse of vertebral body
 Reactive sclerosis on a progressive lytic process
 Enlarged psoas shadow with or without calcification
– Additional radiographic findings may include:
 Vertebral end plates are osteoporotic
 Intervertebral disks may be shrunken or destroyed
 Vertebral bodies show variable degrees of destruction
 Fusiform paravertebral shadows suggest abscess formation
 Bone lesions may occur at more than one level
 Bone scan
 Computed tomography of the spine
 Bone biopsy
 MRI

Prevention
Controlling the spread of tuberculosis infection can prevent tuberculous spondylitis and arthritis. Patients who have a positive PPD test (but not active tuberculosis) may decrease their risk by properly taking medicines to prevent tuberculosis. To effectively treat tuberculosis, patients must take their medications exactly as prescribed.

Management
 Nonoperative – antituberculous drugs
 Analgesics
 Immobilization of the spine region using different types of braces and collars
 Surgery may be necessary, especially to drain spinal abscesses or debride bony lesions fully or to stabilize the spine. A 2007 review found just two randomized clinical trials with at least one-year follow-up that compared chemotherapy plus surgery with chemotherapy alone for treating people diagnosed with active tuberculosis of the spine. As such, no high-quality evidence exists, but the results of this study indicates that surgery should not be recommended routinely and clinicians have to selectively judge and decide on which patients to operate.
 Thoracic spinal fusion with or without instrumentation as a last resort.
 Physical therapy for pain-relieving modalities, postural education, and teaching a home-exercise program for strength and flexibility

Prognosis
 Vertebral collapse resulting in kyphosis
 Spinal cord compression
 Sinus formation
 Paraplegia (so-called Pott's paraplegia)

History
 Saint Gemma of Lucca had tuberculosis of the spine.
 English poets Alexander Pope and William Ernest Henley both had Pott disease.
 Anna Roosevelt Cowles, sister of President Theodore Roosevelt, had Pott disease.
 Søren Kierkegaard may have died from Pott disease, according to professor Kaare Weismann and literature scientist Jens Staubrand
 Chick Webb, a swing-era drummer and band leader, was affected by tuberculosis of the spine as a child, which left him hunchbacked, and eventually caused his death.
 The Sicilian mafia boss Luciano Leggio had the disease and wore a brace.
 Italian writer, poet, and philosopher Giacomo Leopardi had the disease.
 It features prominently in the book This Is a Soul, which chronicles the work of American physician Rick Hodes in Ethiopia.
 Jane Addams, social activist and Nobel Peace Prize winner, had Pott disease.
 Willem Ten Boom, brother of Corrie Ten Boom, died of tuberculosis of the spine in December 1946.
 Writer Max Blecher had Pott disease and wrote about the affliction.
 Marxist thinker and Communist leader Antonio Gramsci had Pott disease, probably due to the bad conditions of his incarceration in fascist Italy during the 1930s.
 Gavrilo Princip, who assassinated Archduke Franz Ferdinand of Austria, leading to World War I, died in prison of bone tuberculosis.
 English writer Denton Welch (1915–1948) died of spinal tuberculosis after being involved in a motor accident (1935) that irreparably damaged his spine.
 Louis Joseph, Dauphin of France, son of King Louis XVI and Marie Antoinette

In works of fiction
 In Ernest Poole's Pulitzer Prize-winning novel, His Family, young Johnny Geer has a terminal case of Pott disease.
 The fictional Hunchback of Notre Dame has a gibbus deformity similar to the type caused by tuberculosis.
 In Henrik Ibsen's play A Doll's House, Dr. Rank has "consumption of the spine".
 Jocelin, the dean who wanted a spire on his cathedral in William Golding's The Spire, probably died as a result of the disease.
 Morton, the railroad magnate in the film Once Upon a Time in the West, has the disease and needs crutches to walk.
 Imogen, in the novella "The Princess with the Golden Hair", part of Memoirs of Hecate County by Edmund Wilson (1946), has Pott disease.
 In the story Two Gentlemen of Verona, written by A. J. Cronin, Lucia had tuberculosis of spine.
 The semi-autobiographical novel Inimi cicatrizate by Max Blecher and the Radu Jude film Scarred Hearts loosely based on it are about a young man, Emanuel, afflicted with Pott disease in a sanatorium.

References

External links 
  Pott's Disease of the Thoracic Spine

Bacterial diseases
Vertebral column disorders